Edward H. Lehner (born March 6, 1933) is an American politician who served in the New York State Assembly from the 73rd district from 1973 to 1980.

References

1933 births
Living people
Democratic Party members of the New York State Assembly